Jean-Jacques Jégou (born March 24, 1945 in Versailles) is a former member of the Senate of France, who represented the Val-de-Marne department. He is a member of the Centrist Union.

External links
Page on the Senate website 

1945 births
Living people
French Senators of the Fifth Republic
People from Versailles
Senators of Val-de-Marne